Pentaphyllus is a genus of darkling beetles in the family Tenebrionidae. There are about six described species in Pentaphyllus.

Species
These six species belong to the genus Pentaphyllus:
 Pentaphyllus californicus b
 Pentaphyllus chrysomeloides (Rossi, 1792) g
 Pentaphyllus ensifera (Fauvel, 1904) g
 Pentaphyllus pallidus LeConte g b
 Pentaphyllus quadricornis Gebien, 1914 g
 Pentaphyllus testaceus (Hellwig, 1792) g b
Data sources: i = ITIS, c = Catalogue of Life, g = GBIF, b = Bugguide.net

References

Further reading

External links

 

Tenebrionidae